KPN Travels is a private travel company operating long-distance intercity bus services between major towns in the South Indian states of Tamil Nadu, Karnataka, Kerala, Telangana, Andhra Pradesh and Puducherry. KPN Travels is headquartered in Salem, Tamil Nadu and was founded in 1972 by Dr. K. Ponmalai Goundar Natarajan.

The company operates air conditioned and non-AC semi-sleeper services on the majority of routes with sleeper and 2+2 A/C Volvo B7R multi-axle services on select routes. The company faces competition from other private operators, state transport corporations.

References 

Bus companies of India
Transport in Tamil Nadu
Transport in Puducherry
Companies based in Salem, Tamil Nadu
1972 establishments in Tamil Nadu
Indian companies established in 1972